FC Yednist Plysky was a Ukrainian professional football team from the village of Plysky in Nizhyn Raion of Chernihiv Oblast. The club continues to play in the Chernihiv Oblast football competition.

Club history

The club was founded in 2001 and is sponsored by a local farming company Ahroservis.

Yednist began participating in the Ukrainian Second League from 2005. The club took the move of entering the professional competition after several years of successfully competing in the Amateur competitions (Fourth Level of competition in Ukraine) including winning the Ukrainian Amateur Cup in 2003.

The reserve club, FC Yednist-2 Plysky, competes in the Chernihivska oblast football competition proved the strength of the club by winning the Ukrainian Amateur Cup in 2007. The PFL has allowed FC Yednist-2 Plysky to compete in the Ukrainian Cup 2008-09 even though Reserves or 2nd teams have not been allowed to compete in the competition since 2001.

After the completion of the First Stage of the 2012–13 Ukrainian Second League season the club withdrew from the Professional Football League. The Vice President of the club informed that the club would return to the amateur leagues citing that there was no financial incentive to play in the second stage of the competition.

The club currently competes in the Chernihivska oblast football competition and also continues to compete in the Ukrainian Amateur championships since leaving the professional leagues.

Honours
Ukrainian Amateur Football Championship
 Winners (1): 2004

Ukrainian Amateur Cup
 Winners (1): 2003
 Runner-Up (1): 2013

Chernihiv Oblast Football Championship
 Winners (5): 2005, 2014, 2015

Chernihiv Oblast Football Cup
 Winners (1): 2005, 2014, 2015

League and cup history

{|class="wikitable"
|-bgcolor="#efefef"
! Season
! Div.
! Pos.
! Pl.
! W
! D
! L
! GS
! GA
! P
!Domestic Cup
!colspan=2|Europe
!Notes
|-bgcolor=SteelBlue
|align=center rowspan=3|2004
|align=center rowspan=3|4th
|align=center|1
|align=center|8
|align=center|6
|align=center|1
|align=center|1
|align=center|27
|align=center|8
|align=center|19
|align=center|
|align=center|
|align=center|
|align=center|
|-bgcolor=SteelBlue
|align=center|1
|align=center|4
|align=center|3
|align=center|1
|align=center|0
|align=center|17
|align=center|6
|align=center|10
|align=center|
|align=center|
|align=center|
|align=center|
|-bgcolor=SteelBlue
|align=center|2
|align=center|3
|align=center|2
|align=center|1
|align=center|0
|align=center|6
|align=center|1
|align=center|7
|align=center|
|align=center|
|align=center|
|align=center bgcolor=tan|Third place
|-bgcolor=PowderBlue
|align=center|2005–06
|align=center|3rd "B"
|align=center|7
|align=center|28
|align=center|10
|align=center|8
|align=center|10
|align=center|38
|align=center|36
|align=center|38
|align=center|1/32 finals
|align=center|
|align=center|
|align=center|
|-bgcolor=PowderBlue
|align=center|2006–07
|align=center|3rd "A"
|align=center bgcolor=tan|3
|align=center|28
|align=center|16
|align=center|6
|align=center|6
|align=center|50
|align=center|24
|align=center|54
|align=center|1/32 finals
|align=center|
|align=center|
|align=center|
|-bgcolor=PowderBlue
|align=center|2007–08
|align=center|3rd "A"
|align=center|5
|align=center|30
|align=center|15
|align=center|6
|align=center|9
|align=center|50
|align=center|36
|align=center|51
|align=center|1/16 finals
|align=center|
|align=center|
|align=center|
|-bgcolor=PowderBlue
|align=center|2008–09
|align=center|3rd "A"
|align=center|12
|align=center|32
|align=center|12
|align=center|4
|align=center|16
|align=center|30
|align=center|40
|align=center|40
|align=center|1/32 finals
|align=center|
|align=center|
|align=center|
|-bgcolor=PowderBlue
|align=center|2009–10
|align=center|3rd "A"
|align=center|6
|align=center|20
|align=center|8
|align=center|5
|align=center|7
|align=center|22
|align=center|11
|align=center|29
|align=center|1/8 finals
|align=center|
|align=center|
|align=center|
|-bgcolor=PowderBlue
|align=center|2010–11
|align=center|3rd "A"
|align=center|8
|align=center|22
|align=center|10
|align=center|2
|align=center|10
|align=center|39
|align=center|26
|align=center|32
|align=center|1/16 finals
|align=center|
|align=center|
|align=center|
|-bgcolor=PowderBlue
|align=center|2011–12
|align=center|3rd "A"
|align=center|13
|align=center|26
|align=center|3
|align=center|6
|align=center|17
|align=center|19
|align=center|57
|align=center|15
|align=center|Did not enter
|align=center|
|align=center|
|align=center|
|-bgcolor=PowderBlue
|align=center|2012–13
|align=center|3rd "A"
|align=center|7
|align=center|20 	
|align=center|5 	
|align=center|5 	
|align=center|10 	
|align=center|17 	
|align=center|30 	
|align=center|20
|align=center|1/64 finals
|align=center|
|align=center|
|align=center bgcolor=pink|Withdrew
|-bgcolor=SteelBlue
|align=center|2014
|align=center|4th
|align=center|4
|align=center|10
|align=center|2
|align=center|2
|align=center|6
|align=center|7
|align=center|16
|align=center|8
|align=center|
|align=center|
|align=center|
|align=center|
|-bgcolor=SteelBlue
|align=center rowspan=3|2015
|align=center rowspan=3|4th
|align=center|2
|align=center|6
|align=center|3
|align=center|0
|align=center|3
|align=center|12
|align=center|7
|align=center|9
|align=center|
|align=center|
|align=center|
|align=center|
|-bgcolor=SteelBlue
|align=center|4
|align=center|10
|align=center|3
|align=center|2
|align=center|5
|align=center|15
|align=center|17
|align=center|11
|align=center|
|align=center|
|align=center|
|align=center|
|-bgcolor=SteelBlue
|align=center|3
|align=center|3 	
|align=center|1 	
|align=center|1 	
|align=center|1 	
|align=center|2 	
|align=center|4 	
|align=center|4
|align=center|
|align=center|
|align=center|
|align=center|
|-bgcolor=SteelBlue
|align=center rowspan=2|2016
|align=center rowspan=2|4th
|align=center|1
|align=center|6 		
|align=center|4 	 	 	
|align=center|1 	
|align=center|1 	 		
|align=center|14 	 	
|align=center|6 	 	
|align=center|13
|align=center|
|align=center|
|align=center|
|align=center|
|-bgcolor=SteelBlue
|align=center|QF
|align=center|2		
|align=center|0 	 	 	
|align=center|1 	
|align=center|1 	 		
|align=center|2 	 	
|align=center|3 	 	
|align=center|1
|align=center|
|align=center|
|align=center|
|align=center|
|-bgcolor=SteelBlue
|align=center|2016–17
|align=center|4th
|align=center|3
|align=center|20 		
|align=center|9 	 	 	
|align=center|6 	
|align=center|5 	 		
|align=center|22 
|align=center|22 
|align=center|33
|align=center|
|align=center|
|align=center|
|align=center|
|-bgcolor=SteelBlue
|align=center|2017–18
|align=center|4th
|align=center|
|align=center| 		
|align=center| 	 	 	
|align=center| 	
|align=center| 	 		
|align=center| 
|align=center| 
|align=center|
|align=center|
|align=center|
|align=center|
|align=center|
|}

FC Yednist-2 Plysky

Yednist-2 entered the Ukrainian Cup competition in 2008 which was the major exclusion to the Ukrainian football regulations that state that no club can enter the Cup competition with multiple team. The FFU has made the exclusion as the team has won the Amateur Cup in the previous year does not hold the professional license. They were permitted to participate in the Ukrainian Cup as the autonomous entity of the Yednist Plysky. In 2007 and 2008 seasons the team has been one of the runners behind Bastion and Luzhany, respectively.

{|class="wikitable"
|-bgcolor="#efefef"
! Season
! Div.
! Pos.
! Pl.
! W
! D
! L
! GS
! GA
! P
!Domestic Cup
!colspan=2|Europe
!Notes
|-
|align=center rowspan=3|2007
|align=center rowspan=3|4th
|align=center|1
|align=center|8
|align=center|4
|align=center|1
|align=center|3
|align=center|16
|align=center|15
|align=center|13
|align=center rowspan=3|
|align=center|
|align=center|
|align=center|
|-
|align=center|1
|align=center|1
|align=center|1
|align=center|0
|align=center|0
|align=center|2
|align=center|0
|align=center|3
|align=center|
|align=center|
|align=center|
|-
|align=center|1
|align=center|2
|align=center|2
|align=center|0
|align=center|0
|align=center|4
|align=center|2
|align=center|6
|align=center|
|align=center|
|align=center|Lost final
|-
|align=center rowspan=2|2008
|align=center rowspan=2|4th
|align=center|2
|align=center|8
|align=center|5
|align=center|2
|align=center|1
|align=center|17
|align=center|11
|align=center|17
|align=center rowspan=2|1/32 finals
|align=center|
|align=center|
|align=center|
|-
|align=center|2
|align=center|3
|align=center|1
|align=center|2
|align=center|0
|align=center|2
|align=center|1
|align=center|5
|align=center|
|align=center|
|align=center|
|-
|align=center rowspan=2|2009
|align=center rowspan=2|4th
|align=center|1
|align=center|6
|align=center|5
|align=center|0
|align=center|1
|align=center|15
|align=center|5
|align=center|15
|align=center rowspan=2|
|align=center|
|align=center|
|align=center|
|-
|align=center|1
|align=center|3
|align=center|2
|align=center|1
|align=center|0
|align=center|5
|align=center|2
|align=center|7
|align=center|
|align=center|
|align=center|Champions
|-
|align=center rowspan=2|2010
|align=center rowspan=2|4th
|align=center|2
|align=center|6
|align=center|3
|align=center|0
|align=center|3
|align=center|12
|align=center|7
|align=center|9
|align=center rowspan=2|
|align=center|
|align=center|
|align=center|
|-
|align=center|2
|align=center|3
|align=center|2
|align=center|0
|align=center|1
|align=center|10
|align=center|4
|align=center|6
|align=center|
|align=center|
|align=center|
|-
|align=center|2011
|align=center|4th
|align=center|3
|align=center|10
|align=center|5
|align=center|1
|align=center|4
|align=center|14
|align=center|17
|align=center|16
|align=center|
|align=center|RC
|align=center|Final Group stage
|align=center|Lost playoffs
|}

Notable Player 
  Teymuraz Mchedlishvili

Managers

Yednist Plysky
 2005 Viktor Hryshchenko
 2006–2007 Anatoliy Murakhovskyi
 2008 Vadym Dyord
 2009–2011 Vadym Lazorenko
 2010 Vadym Mandriyevskyi (interim)
 2011 Volodymyr Stetsyuk
 2012 Vitaly Levchenko
 2012–2013 Anatoliy Murakhovskyi
 2014–2015 Kostyantyn Sakharov
 2015–2016 Vitaliy Belokon
 2016–2017 Yuriy Len
 2017 Illya Blyznyuk
 2017–2018 Ihor Prodan

Yednist-2 Plysky
 2009–2011 Serhiy Bakun
 2011 Volodymyr Stetsyuk
 2012 Vadym Shelmenko

References

External links
 http://www.ednist.com.ua/ 
  Коротко про "Єдність" (Short write up about Yednist) Shakhtar Donetsk visit to Yednist for Kubok game

 
Football clubs in Chernihiv Oblast
Amateur football clubs in Ukraine
Association football clubs established in 2001
2001 establishments in Ukraine